Dodge County High School is a public high school located in Eastman, Georgia, United States. The school is part of the Dodge County School District, which serves Dodge County.

Overview

Dodge County High School is a SACS (Southern Association of Colleges and Schools) and GAC (Georgia Accrediting Commission) accredited school, where students can work towards a College Prep, College Prep Plus, Tech Prep, Tech Prep Plus, or Community Achievement Program diploma. Course work within these areas may include programs such as EMAC (Educational Media Academic Courses), which consists of foreign language offerings in Latin, German, and Japanese, and often involves video or phone lessons.

The Georgia Accel Program offers post-secondary options with Middle Georgia College and Georgia Aviation and Technical College.  Apprenticeship programs are offered to students pursuing a Tech Prep or Tech Prep Plus diploma. Apprenticeship areas include teacher cadet, child care, heating and air, aircraft-sheet metal, and health occupations, and are offered through dual enrollment with Heart of Georgia Technical College. The Instructional Support Department offers special education students the opportunity to get work site experience in addition to their regular courses of study.

Athletics

Football 
Dodge County High School has had two former football players make it to the NFL. Benji Roland played for the Tampa Bay Buccaneers in 1990 as defensive end. He was also part of the 1988 College Football All-America Team, played for Auburn University, and made it into the 1989 NFL Draft. The other notable player is Leonard Floyd of the Los Angeles Rams. He played college football at The University of Georgia where he played outside linebacker, and later was drafted 9th overall in the 2016 NFL Draft after declaring early as a junior.

Regional titles

Clubs and activities

Notable alumni
 Leonard Floyd - outside linebacker/defensive end (Los Angeles Rams), 9th overall selection of 2016 NFL Draft

References

External links
Dodge County School District
Dodge County High School

Schools in Dodge County, Georgia
Public high schools in Georgia (U.S. state)
Educational institutions established in 1957
Schools accredited by the Southern Association of Colleges and Schools
Georgia Accrediting Commission
1957 establishments in Georgia (U.S. state)